Růžička (feminine Růžičková) is a Czech surname. Ružička (feminine Ružičková) is a Slovak surname.

People
Adam Ružička (born 1999), Slovak ice hockey player
Andrea Růžičková (born 1884), Slovak actress
Antonín Růžička (born 1993), Czech ice hockey player
Dan Růžička (born 1991), Czech ice hockey player
David Růžička (born 1988), Czech ice hockey player
Drahomír Josef Růžička (1870–1960), Czech-born American photographer
František Ružička (born 1966), Slovak diplomat
Gayle Ruzicka (born c. 1943), American activist
Hana Růžičková (1941–1981), Czech gymnast
Helena Růžičková (1936–2004), Czech actress
Jan Růžička (born 1997), Czech ice hockey player
Jiří Růžička (born 1941), Czech basketball player
Josef Růžička (1925–1986), Czechoslovak wrestler
Karel Růžička (1909–?), Czechoslovak bobsledder
Karel Růžička (pianist) (1940–2016), Czech pianist
Leopold Ružička (1887–1976), Croatian chemist
Marek Růžička (born 1995), Czech ice hockey player
Marie Růžičková, Slovak basketball player
Marla Ruzicka (1976–2005), American activist and aid worker
Martin Růžička (born 1985), Czech ice hockey player
Martina Růžičková (born 1980), Czech cyclist
Miroslav Růžička (born 1959), Czech sport shooter
Nils Ruzicka (born 1973), German record producer
Peter Ruzicka (born 1948), German composer
Peter Ružička (1947–2003), Slovak computer scientist
Peter Arne Ruzicka (born 1964), Norwegian businessman
Rudolf Růžička, Czechoslovak modern pentathlete
Rudolf Růžička (composer) (born 1941), Czech composer
Rudolph Ruzicka (1883–1978), Czech-born American illustrator and book designer
Štefan Ružička (born 1985), Slovak ice hockey player
Věra Růžičková (1928–2018), Czech gymnast
Viktor Růžička (1943–2013), Czech cinematographer
Vladimír Růžička (born 1963), Czech ice hockey player and coach
Vladimír Růžička (ice hockey b. 1989), Czech ice hockey player
Werner Ruzicka (born 1943), German boxer
Zdeněk Růžička (1925–2021), Czechoslovak gymnast
Zuzana Růžičková, Czech harpsichordist

Other
Ruzicka (TV series), a Canadian television series

See also
 

Czech-language surnames
Slovak-language surnames